Ellenville High School is a co-ed high school in Ellenville, New York. The school is in the Ellenville Central School District, which serves Ellenville, the town of Wawarsing and the hamlets of Cragsmoor and Napanoch.

The building was renovated in 1996 and features a highly advanced distance learning classroom, as well as a state-of-the-art digital security system. It also was one of the first fifteen participants in a statewide anti-school violence program started by then-Attorney General Eliot Spitzer.

In 2007 the New York Foundation for Educational Reform and Accountability identified the school as one of upstate New York's fifteen "dropout factories", based on data from a Johns Hopkins study that it claimed showed 60 percent or less of its graduating senior classes had been Ellenville ninth graders.

References

External links 
School website

Public high schools in New York (state)
Schools in Ulster County, New York
Wawarsing, New York